Cyclophora conferta is a moth in the  family Geometridae. It is found in Jamaica.

References

Moths described in 1900
Cyclophora (moth)
Moths of the Caribbean